The American Discovery Trail is a system of recreational trails and roads that collectively form a coast-to-coast hiking and biking trail across the mid-tier of the United States. Horses can also be ridden on most of this trail. The coastal trailheads are the Delmarva Peninsula on the Atlantic Ocean and the northern California coast on the Pacific Ocean. The trail has northern and southern alternates for part of its distance, passing through Chicago and St. Louis respectively. It is the only non-motorized coast-to-coast trail.

The trail passes through 14 national parks and 16 national forests and uses sections of or connects to five National Scenic Trails, 10 National Historic Trails, and 23 National Recreation Trails. For part of its distance, it is coincident with the North Country Trail, the Buckeye Trail, the Continental Divide Trail, and the Colorado Trail.

The trail passes through the District of Columbia and the following 15 states:
 Delaware
 Maryland
 West Virginia
 Ohio
 Indiana
 Illinois
 Kentucky
 Iowa
 Missouri
 Nebraska
 Kansas
 Colorado
 Utah
 Nevada
 California

Hiking records

Joyce and Pete Cottrell, of Whitefield, New Hampshire, were the first to backpack the entire official route of the American Discovery Trail. They hiked the segments out of sequence over two calendar years, finishing in 2003.

The first hikers to complete the trail in one continuous walk were Marcia and Ken Powers, a wife and husband team from Pleasanton, California. Their trail walk lasted from February 27 to October 15, 2005. They started out from Cape Henlopen State Park in Delaware and ended at Point Reyes, California. They trailed  by foot, averaging  a day.

The first person to backpack the entire  (including both Northern and Southern sections) in one continuous hike was Mike "Lion King" Daniel. He started from Cape Henlopen State Park on June 17, 2007, and ended at Point Reyes, California, on November 5, 2008.

The first person to cover the entire equestrian route on horseback was Matt Parker. He undertook the journey between May 2003 and November 2005.

Notable locations
At Cedar Rapids, a mural was posted on Greene Square in 2019 to mark both the American Discovery Trail, which passes through downtown, and the Cedar Lake-Smokestack Bridge project.

The following notable locations are found along or adjacent to the route of the American Discovery Trail. They are listed from east to west to correspond with the itinerary typically followed by thru-hikers to take advantage of the best seasonal weather conditions.

Cape Henlopen State Park, the eastern terminus of the trail in Delaware.
Argentine Pass, Colorado, the highest point in the trail where it crosses the Rockies.
Limantour Beach, Point Reyes, the western terminus of the trail in California.

Other affiliated locations 
The following locations are found along or adjacent to the route of the American Discovery Trail.  They are divided into categories within each state, organized by state from east to west.

Delaware

Affiliated trails 
 Cape Henlopen Bike Trail
 Georgetown-Lewes Trail

Forests 
 Redden State Forest

Parks 
 Cape Henlopen State Park

Points of interest 
 Historic towns of Lewes and Milton

Maryland

Affiliated trails 
 Love Point to Lewes, DE "Smuggler's Trail" formerly Queen Anne's Railroad 
 Washington, Baltimore and Annapolis (WB&A) Rail Trail 
 Baltimore and Annapolis (B&A) Trail 
 East Coast Greenway 
 Anacostia Tributary Trails 
 Fort Circle Trail 
 Capital Crescent Trail 
 Rock Creek Park Trail 
 Appalachian National Scenic Trail 
 Potomac Heritage National Scenic Trail 
 Allegheny Highlands Trail 
 Star Spangled Banner National Historic Trail 
 Captain John Smith Chesapeake National Historic Trail

Parks 
 Martinak State Park 
 Tuckahoe State Park, Adkins Arboretum 
 Horsehead Wetlands Center (Wildfowl viewing) 
 Sandy Point State Park 
 Greenbelt Park
 Rock Creek Park 
 Chesapeake & Ohio Canal National Historical Park

West Virginia

Affiliated trails 
 North Bend Rail Trail 
 Harrison County Rail-Trail 
 Dryfork Rail-Trail 
 Allegheny Trail

Forests 
 Monongahela National Forest

Parks 
 Harpers Ferry National Historic Park 
 Canaan Valley Resort State Park 
 Tygart Lake State Park 
 Blackwater Falls State Park 
 North Bend State Park

Ohio

Affiliated trails 
 Buckeye Trail 
 Burr Oak Loop Trail 
 Robert and Mary Lou Paton Trail in Burr Oak State Park 
 Grandma Gatewood Trail in Hocking Hills State Park 
 Perimeter Trail in East Fork Park 
 The Riverwalk in Cincinnati 
 The Shaker Trace in Miami-Whitewater Forest Hamilton County Park 
 Hueston Woods State Park Trails 
 Hedgeapple Trail 
 Big Woods Trail 
 Sugar Bush Trail 
 West Shore Trail in Hueston Woods State Park

Forests 
 Wayne National Forest 
 Hocking State Forest 
 Tar Hollow State Forest 
 Scioto Trail State Forest 
 Pike State Forest 
 Shawnee State Forest

Parks 
 Burr Oak State Park 
 Logan State Park
 Hocking Hills State Park 
 Tar Hollow State Park 
 Scioto Trail State Park 
 Pike Lake State Park 
 Fort Hill State Memorial 
 Serpent Mound State Memorial
 Davis Memorial 
 Shawnee State Park 
 Grant Lake St. Mary's State Park
 East Fork State Park 
 Little Miami River State Park 
 Eden Park 
 Bicentennial Common in Cincinnati 
 Devou park (Kentucky) 
 Harrison's Tomb 
 Miami - Whitewater Forest Hamilton County Park 
 Indian Creek Preserve 
 Gov. Bebb Butler County Metropark 
 Hueston Woods State Park

Indiana (Northern route)

Affiliated trails 
 Whitewater Gorge National Recreation Trail 
 Cardinal Greenway 
 Erie Trail-North Judson 
 Nickel Plate Trail

Parks 
 Tippecanoe River State Park
 Summit Lake State Park

Indiana (Southern route)

Affiliated trails 
 Pigeon Creek Greenway 
 Knobstone Trail 
 Two Lakes Trail 
 Adventure Trail 
 Burdette Park/University of Southern Indiana Pedestrian, Bicycle, and Nature Trail 
 Heritage Trail of Madison

Forests 
 Clark State Forest
 Harrison-Crawford State Forest
 Hoosier National Forest

Parks 
 Burdette Park
 Clifty Falls State Park
 Lincoln State Park
 Falls of the Ohio State Park
 O'Bannon Woods State Park

Illinois (Northern route)

Affiliated trails 
 Old Plank Road Trail 
 Illinois and Michigan Canal State Trail 
 Grand Illinois Trail 
 Sauk Trail Forest Preserve Trail 
 Thorn Creek Trail 
 Hennepin Canal Parkway State Trail 
 Great River Trail

Parks 
 Indian Boundary Park
Dewey Helmick Nature Preserve
 Hickory Creek Bikeway Trailhead Park
 Channahon State Park
 McKinley Woods State Park 
 William G. Stratton State Park
 Gebhard Woods State Park
 Illini State Park
 Starved Rock State Park
 Buffalo Rock State Park
 Mathhiessen State Park
 Hennepin Canal Parkway State Park

Illinois (Southern route)

Affiliated trails 
 River to River Trail 
 Metro-East Levee Trail 
 Tunnel Hill State Trail

Forests
 Shawnee National Forest

Parks 
 Devil's Backbone Park 
 Ferne Clyffe State Park
 Giant City State Park
 Cave In Rock State Park

Iowa (Northern route)

Affiliated trails 
 Riverfront Trail 
 Hoover Nature Trail 
 Cedar River Trail 
 Cedar Valley Nature Trail 
 Cedar Valley Lakes Trail 
 Pioneer Trail 
 Comet Trail 
 Heart of Iowa Nature Trail 
 Saylorville-Des Moines River Trail 
 Raccoon River Valley Trail 
 T-Bone Trail 
 Wabash Trace Trail

Parks 
 Deerwood Park 
 George Wyth State Park
 Wild Cat Den State Park
 Pleasant Creek State Park

Missouri (Southern route)

Affiliated trails 
 Katy Trail
 Lewis and Clark National Historic Trail
 Rock Island Spur

Forests 
 Daniel Boone State Forest
 Baltimore Bend State Forest

Parks 
 Forest Park
 Missouri State Park
 Frontier Park 
 Swope Park 
 Arrow Rock State Historic Site
 Van Meter State Park

Nebraska (Northern route)

Affiliated trails 
 Pony Express National Historic Trail
 Mormon Pioneer National Historic Trail
 MoPac East Trail 
 Oak Creek Trail 
 Lewis and Clark National Historic Trail
 California National Historic Trail
 Oregon National Historic Trail

Parks 
 Fort Kearny State Historical Park
 Ash Hollow State Historical Park
 Buffalo Bill Ranch State Historical Park

Kansas (Southern route)

Affiliated trails 
 Santa Fe National Historic Trail

Parks 
 Shawnee Mission Park
 Clinton State Park

Colorado

Affiliated trails 
 Pueblo Riverwalk 
 Canon City Riverwalk 
 Cripple Creek Trails System 
 Ute Pass Trail 
 America The Beautiful Trail 
 Green Mountain Falls Bikeway 
 Sinton Trail 
 Pikes Peak Greenway 
 New Santa Fe Trail 
 Carpenter Peak Trail 
 Chatfield Trails System 
 South Platte River Trail 
 Bear Creek Greenway 
 Castle Trail 
 People's Path 
 Warren Gulch Trail 
 Spring Creek Trail 
 South Park Trail 
 Burning Bear Trail 
 Hall Valley Trail 
 Colorado Trail 
 Vail Pass Tenmile Canyon National Recreation Trail 
 Chalk Creek Trail 
 Continental Divide National Scenic Trail
 Timberline Trail 
 Taylor Pass Trail 
 Brush Creek Trail 
 Crystal River Trail 
 Braderick Creek Trail 
 Lake Ridge Lakes Trail 
 High Trail 
 Sunlight-Powderhorn Snowmobile Trail 
 Leon Lake Trail 
 Crag Crest National Recreation Trail 
 Kannah Creek Trail 
 Old Spanish Trail 
 Colorado Riverfront Trail 
 Liberty Cap Trail 
 Black Ridge Trail 
 Monument Canyon Trail 
 Kokopelli's Trail 
 Fountain Creek Greenway 
 Cavalier Park Trail

Forests 
 Pike National Forest
 Arapaho National Forest
 San Isabel National Forest
 Gunnison National Forest
 White River National Forest
 Grand Mesa National Forest

Parks 
 John Martin Reservoir State Park
 Lake Pueblo State Park
 Mueller State Park
 Garden of the Gods Park
 Roxborough State Park
 Chatfield State Park
 Bear Creek Regional Park
 Mount Falcon Park
 O'Fallon Denver Mountain Park
 Elk Meadow Park

Utah

Affiliated trails 
 Kokopelli's Trail 
 Great Western Trail 
 Paiute ATV Trail 
 Oak Creek Trail 
 Lockhart Basin Trail 
 Hurrah Pass Trail

Forests 
 Dixie National Forest 
 Fishlake National Forest 
 Manti-La Sal National Forest

Parks 
 Canyonlands National Park 
 Capitol Reef National Park

Nevada

Affiliated trails 
 Tahoe Rim Trail
 Pony Express National Historic Trail
 Mount Jefferson Trail 
 Toiyabe National Recreation Trail

Forests 
 Humboldt-Toiyabe National Forest

Parks 
 Great Basin National Park
 Cave Lake State Park
 Ward Charcoal Ovens State Historic Park
 Currant Mountain Wilderness
 Alta Toquima Wilderness
 Arc Dome Wilderness
 Berlin-Ichthyosaur State Park
 Sand Mountain Recreation Area
 Grimes Point National Historic Site
 Fort Churchill State Historic Park
 Washoe Lake State Park
 Mt. Rose Wilderness
 Lake Tahoe State Park
 Table Mountain Wilderness

California

Affiliated trails 
 Tahoe Rim Trail
 Western States Trail 
 Pacific Crest Trail
 Foresthill Loop Trail 
 Confluence Trail 
 Pioneer Express Trail 
 American River Bike Trail 
 Jedediah Smith National Recreation Trail 
 Delta de Anza Regional Trail 
 Stewartville Trail 
 Ridge Trail 
 Black Diamond Trail 
 Cumberland Trail 
 Black Diamond to Mt. Diablo Trail 
 Bruce Lee Trail 
 Mitchell Canyon Trail 
 Deer Flat Creek Trail 
 Prospectors Gap Trail 
 North Peak Trail 
 Summit Trail 
 Wall Point Trail 
 Briones-Mount Diablo Trail 
 Lafayette Ridge Trail 
 Homestead Valley Trail 
 Oursan Trail 
 Bear Creek Trail 
 Inspiration Trail 
 Bay Area Ridge Trail 
 Sea View Trail 
 Vollmer Peak Trail 
 Grizzly Peak Trail 
 San Francisco Bay Trail
 SCA Trail 
 Bobcat Trail 
 Miwok Trail 
 Redwood Creek Trail 
 Deer Creek Park Fire Trail 
 Hillside Trail 
 Ben Johnson Trail 
 Stapleveldt Trail 
 Matt Davis Trail 
 Coastal Trail 
 Bolinas Ridge Trail 
 Randall Trail 
 Olema Valley Trail 
 Stewart Trail 
 Glen Trail 
 Bear Valley Trail 
 Coast Trail 
 Mokelumne Coast to Crest Trail

Parks 
 Granite Chief Wilderness
 Auburn State Recreation Area
 Folsom Lake State Recreation Area
 American River Parkway
 Discovery Park
 William Land Park
 Contra Loma Regional Park
 Black Diamond Mines Regional Preserve
 Mt. Diablo State Park
 Shell Ridge Open Space
 Heather Farms Park
 Acalanes Ridge Open Space
 Briones Regional Park
 Wildcat Canyon Regional Park
 Tilden Regional Park
 Presidio of San Francisco
 Golden Gate National Recreation Area
 Muir Woods National Monument
 Mount Tamalpais State Park
 Point Reyes National Seashore

Further reading 
 Foot, William; Foot, Laurel. (2006) The American Discovery Trail Trail Data, American Discovery Trail Society. . Maps included: Sussex County: bicycle map; Chesapeake and Ohio Canal; American Discovery Trail, Western West Virginia and Ohio Route; and American Discovery Trail, California Route.
"American Discovery Trail — Linking Eastern Iowa" legis.iowa.gov.
 Committee on Energy and Natural Resources, Senate, United States Congress. (1998) National Discovery Trails Act and National Historic Lighthouse Preservation Act: Hearing Before the Committee on Energy and Natural Resources, United States Senate, One Hundred Fifth Congress, Second Session on S. 1069 ... S. 1403 ... February 11, 1998. Volume 4, S. hrg, Volume 105, issue 475, United States Government Printing Office, .
 United States Congress ; House ; Committee on Resources ; Subcommittee on National Parks and Public Lands. (1997) Hearing on H.R. 588, to amend the National Trails System Act to create a new category of long-distance trails to be known as National Discovery Trails, to authorize the American Discovery Trail as the first trail in that category, and for other purposes ; and H.R. 1513 a bill to amend the National Trails System Act to designate the Lincoln National Historic Trail as a component of the National Trails System: hearing before the Subcommittee on National Parks and Public Lands of the Committee on Resources, House of Representatives, One Hundred Fifth Congress, first session on H.R. 588 and H.R. 1513--to amend the National Trails System Act, June 10, 1997--Washington, DC. GPO,  .
 American Hiking Society ; National Park Service. (1995) America's Trails: A Directory of Organizations and Managing Agencies 1995. American Hiking Society.
 Lukei, Reese (1995) The American Discovery Trail: Explorer's Guide. Johnson Books, 1995, .

References

External links

 
 ADT Data Books

 
Hiking trails in California
Hiking trails in Colorado
Hiking trails in Delaware
Hiking trails in Illinois
Hiking trails in Indiana
Hiking trails in Iowa
Hiking trails in Kansas
Hiking trails in Kentucky
Hiking trails in Maryland
Hiking trails in Missouri
Hiking trails in Nebraska
Hiking trails in Nevada
Hiking trails in Ohio
Hiking trails in Utah
Hiking trails in West Virginia
Long-distance trails in the United States